The Penthouse Tapes is the fifth studio album by The Sensational Alex Harvey Band. Unlike previous releases comprising predominantly original compositions.The Penthouse Tapes consists largely of covers, ranging from The Osmonds' "Crazy Horses" and Alice Cooper's "School's Out" to Lead Belly's "Goodnight Irene". Of the three originals, "I Wanna Have You Back" (written by Harvey with Zal Cleminson) and "Jungle Jenny" (by the band with producer David Batchelor) open side one; a third, "Say You're Mine", was written by Alex Harvey and appears on side two. The album was released in 1976 on Vertigo Records.

Track listing
"I Wanna Have You Back" (Alex Harvey, Zal Cleminson) – 2:42
"Jungle Jenny" (David Batchelor, SAHB) – 4:07
"Runaway" (Del Shannon, Max Crook) – 2:46
"Love Story" (Ian Anderson) – 5:10
"School's Out" (Alice Cooper, Michael Bruce, Glen Buxton, Dennis Dunaway, Neal Smith) – 5:02
"Goodnight Irene" (Lead Belly) – 4:30
"Say You're Mine (Every Cowboy Song)" (Harvey) – 3:23
"Gamblin' Bar Room Blues" (Jimmie Rodgers, Shelly Lee Alley) – 4:09
"Crazy Horses" (Alan Osmond, Wayne Osmond, Merrill Osmond) – 2:54
"Cheek To Cheek" (Irving Berlin) – 3:52 (recorded live at the New Victoria Theatre, London, Christmas 1975)

Side two of the original vinyl version begins with "Goodnight Irene".

Personnel

The Sensational Alex Harvey Band
 Alex Harvey – lead vocals
 Zal Cleminson – guitars
 Chris Glen – bass guitar
 Hugh McKenna – keyboards, synthesizer
 Ted McKenna – drums, percussion

Additional musicians
 B.J. Cole – pedal steel guitar on "Say You're Mine" and "Cheek To Cheek"

Technical
 David Batchelor – producer
 John Burns, John Punter, Douglas Hopkins, Denny Bridges – engineer
 Alex Harvey – liner notes

Charts

Certifications

References

The Sensational Alex Harvey Band albums
1976 albums
Vertigo Records albums